The North Branch Kishwaukee River is a  tributary of the Kishwaukee River in northern Illinois.

Course
The North Branch Kishwaukee River northeast of Harvard, Illinois and flows south through McHenry County. to join the Kishwaukee River east of Marengo.

Description
The North Branch Kishwaukee River flows in an east–west direction from its point of origin and has a generally unimpeded flow, save a dam at Belvidere, Illinois. Nearer its point of origin the North Branch has a substrate of gravel, the substrate becomes sand and silt going further downstream.

References

Kishwaukee, North
Kishwaukee, North
Rivers of Illinois